The 1958 Wightman Cup was the 30th edition of the annual women's team tennis competition between the United States and Great Britain. It was held at the All England Lawn Tennis and Croquet Club in London in England in the United Kingdom.

References

Wightman Cups by year
Wightman Cup, 1958
Wightman Cup
Wightman Cup
Wightman Cup
Wightman Cup